Justina Mikulskytė (born 6 February 1996) is a Lithuanian tennis player.

Mikulskytė has won four singles titles and 17 doubles titles on the ITF Women's Circuit. On 9 May 2022, she reached her best singles ranking of world No. 239, and on 30 January 2023, she peaked at No. 154 in the WTA doubles rankings.

Playing for Lithuania Fed Cup team, Mikulskytė has a win–loss record of 15–9 (8–4 in doubles) as of July 2022.

Grand Slam performance

Singles

ITF finals

Singles: 6 (4 titles, 2 runner–ups)

Doubles: 27 (17 titles, 10 runner–ups)

Fed Cup/Billie Jean King Cup participation

Singles

Doubles

Notes

References

External links
 
 
 

1996 births
Living people
Sportspeople from Šiauliai
Lithuanian female tennis players